Anapisa holobrunnea is a moth of the  family Erebidae. It was described by Tams in 1932. It is found in Ghana and Guinea.

References

Moths described in 1932
Syntomini
Insects of West Africa
Erebid moths of Africa